Sir Gilbert Samuel Inglefield GBE KCB (13 March 190914 October 1991) was a British architect and Lord Mayor of London from November 1967 to November 1968.

Inglefield was the son of Admiral Sir Frederick Samuel Inglefield KCB FRGS DL, and Millicent Evelyn Cecilia Crompton the heiress of the Derbyshire banker John Gilbert Crompton

He was an Alderman of the City of London. In 1957, he was appointed chairman of the Barbican Committee, responsible for building the Barbican Estate, replacing Eric Wilkins, who had died.

He appeared as a castaway on the BBC Radio programme Desert Island Discs on 1 July 1968.

On 23 September 1968, he laid the foundation stone of the relocated London Bridge, at Lake Havasu City, Arizona, United States.

Inglefield was a Knight Commander of the Order of the Bath and a Knight Grand Cross of the Order of the British Empire. From 1950 to 1976 he lived at Eggington House, the manor house of the village of Eggington, near Leighton Buzzard, Bedfordshire. Gilbert Inglefield Middle School (now Gilbert Inglefield Academy) at Leighton Buzzard was named in his honour.

His brother, Colonel John Frederick Crompton-Inglefield of Parwich Hall, served as High Sheriff of Derbyshire in 1938.

References

External links 
 The Mansion House - The MCC Reception 1968 British Pathe newsreel featuring Inglefield

20th-century English politicians
20th-century lord mayors of London
1909 births
1991 deaths
Aldermen of the City of London
Gilbert
People from Central Bedfordshire District
Place of birth missing
Place of death missing
Royal Institute of British Architects